The Wizards of Odd is a 1996 English compilation book of humorous short stories by many great writers in the science-fiction/fantasy genre. The stories were compiled by Peter Haining. The book is separated into three sections: Wizards and Wotsits: Stories of Cosmic Absurdity, Swords and Sorcery: Tales of Heroic Fantasy, and Astronauts and Aliens: Space Opera Yarns.

Stories

Wizards and Wotsits
"Theatre of Cruelty" by Terry Pratchett
"How Nuth Would Have Practised his Art Upon the Gnoles" by Lord Dunsany
"Hell Hath No Fury" by John Collier
"The Twonky" by Henry Kuttner
"A Great Deal of Power" by Eric Frank Russell
"Doodad" by Ray Bradbury
"Not By Its Cover" by Philip K. Dick
"The Rule of Names" by Ursula K. Le Guin

Swords and Sorcery
"Mythical Beast" by Stephen R. Donaldson
"The Adventure of the Snowing Globe" by F. Anstey
"Affairs in Poictesme" by James Branch Cabell
"The Ring of Hans Carvel" by Fredric Brown
"The Brat" by Fritz Leiber
"A Good Knight's Work" by Robert Bloch
"Poor Little Warrior" by Brian W. Aldiss
"The Odd Odd Bird" by Avram Davidson

Astronauts and Aliens
"Young Zaphod Plays it Safe" by Douglas Adams
"The Wild Asses of the Devil" by H. G. Wells
"Ministering Angels" by C. S. Lewis
"The Gnurrs Come from the Voodvork Out" by Reginald Bretnor
"Captain Wyxtpthll's Flying Saucer" by Arthur C. Clarke
"Playboy and the Slime God" by Isaac Asimov
"There's a Wolf in my Time Machine" by Larry Niven
"2BR02B" by Kurt Vonnegut, Jr.

Reception
Gideon Kibblewhite reviewed The Wizards of Odd for Arcane magazine, rating it a 9 out of 10 overall. Kibblewhite comments that "It's difficult to award any anthology a perfect ten because some stories are inevitably better than others; The Wizards of Odd, though, comes close: a great nine."

Reviews
Review by Steven H Silver (1997) in SF Site, Mid-December 1997, (1997)
Review by Don D'Ammassa (1998) in Science Fiction Chronicle, #195 February 1998

References

1996 books
Fantasy anthologies
Science fiction anthologies
Souvenir Press books